Technofantasy is a subgenre of fantasy, which has some elements of science and technology but it does not rationalize their use through scientific or quasi-scientific terms, which distinguishes it from science fiction and science fantasy. The less realistic and the more "technobabble" any explanation is, the closer the work is to technofantasy. The concept of technofantasy has been described as "destroying the difference between magic and science".

See also 

 Clarke's third law
 hard fantasy
 hard science fiction
 Sanderson's Laws of Magic
 soft science fiction
 sword and planet

References 

Fantasy genres